Lankenau is a surname. Notable people with the surname include: 

Cris Lankenau (born 1981), American actor
John D. Lankenau (1817–1901), German-American businessman and philanthropist
Jorge Lankenau (1944–2012), Mexican banker and businessman